Jiří Daler (born 8 March 1940) is a retired cyclist from  Czechoslovakia. His sporting career began with Dukla Brno. As an amateur track cyclist he competed at the 1964 and 1968 Summer Olympics in five events in total. In the 4000 m individual pursuit, he won a gold medal in 1964 and finished in 14th place in 1968; in both Games he finished fifth in the team pursuit.  Between 1964 and 1967 he won one silver and four bronze medals in the individual and team pursuit events at the world championships. In 1967, he also set two world records, in the 4000 m and 5000 m sprint. He then became a professional road racer and finished four times within the podium in 1968–1969: in Saint-Aigulin (1968), La Bastide d'Armagnac (1968), Saint-Raphael (1969) and Tour de l'Herault (1969).

Major results
1964
 1st  Individual pursuit, Olympic Games

References

1940 births
Czech male cyclists
Czechoslovak male cyclists
Olympic cyclists of Czechoslovakia
Olympic gold medalists for Czechoslovakia
Cyclists at the 1964 Summer Olympics
Cyclists at the 1968 Summer Olympics
Sportspeople from Brno
Living people
Olympic medalists in cycling
Medalists at the 1964 Summer Olympics
Czech track cyclists